The Journal of Chemical & Engineering Data is a peer-reviewed scientific journal, published since 1956 by the American Chemical Society. JCED is currently indexed in: Chemical Abstracts Service (CAS), SCOPUS, EBSCOhost, ProQuest, British Library, PubMed, Ovid, Web of Science, and SwetsWise.

The current Editor is J. Ilja Siepmann.

References

External links

American Chemical Society academic journals
Publications established in 1956
Monthly journals
Chemical engineering journals
English-language journals